The 24th Filipino Academy of Movie Arts and Sciences Awards Night was held in 1977. This was for the outstanding achievements in films in 1976.

A Nora Aunor film, Minsa'y isang gamu-gamo from Premiere Productions, was the most nominated with eight nominations and the most awarded with five wins including FAMAS Award for Best Picture and the Best Director for Lupita Aquino-Kashiwahara. However, Aunor was not nominated for this film but she did win for another film, Tatlong taong walang Diyos, her first award from FAMAS after five nominations. Christopher de Leon won his second best actor trophy from FAMAS making it only the second time a husband and wife had won the major acting awards in FAMAS history.

Awards

Major awards
Winners are listed first and highlighted with boldface.

References

External links
FAMAS Awards 

FAMAS Award
FAMAS
FAMAS